= Ammonium hexafluorogermanate =

Names
- IUPAC name diazanium; hexafluoro germanium(2-)
- Other names Ammonium hexafluorogermanate(III), diammonium hexafluorogermanate

Identifiers
CAS Number	16962-47-3
3D model (JSmol)	Interactive image
EC Number	241-037-4
PubChem CID	16717611
- InChI: InChI=1S/F6Ge.2H3N/c1-7(2,3,4,5)6;;/h;2*1H3/q-2;;/p+2 Key: NDVZEQNPAUUIMP-UHFFFAOYSA-P
- SMILES: [NH4+].[NH4+].F[Ge-2](F)(F)(F)(F)F

Properties
Chemical formula	F_{6}GeH_{8}N_{2}
Molar mass	222.698 g·mol^{−1}
Appearance	white crystals
Density	2.564 g/cm^{3}
Solubility in water	soluble

Hazards
- GHS labelling
Pictograms	(GHS07: Exclamation mark)
Signal word	Warning
- Except where otherwise noted, data are given for materials in their standard state (at 25 °C [77 °F], 100 kPa). Infobox references

Ammonium hexafluorogermanate is an inorganic chemical compound with the chemical formula (NH_{4})_{2}GeF_{6}.

== Physical properties ==
Ammonium hexafluorogermanate forms white crystals, soluble in water. Crystals are of cubic system, space group Fm3m. It is insoluble in alcohol.
